Markus Feyerabend (born 1971) is a German glider aerobatic pilot.

He started gliding in 1987 at the club SFG Weilheim (now: LSV Weilheim-Peißenberg e.V.). Before he obtained his aerobatic rating in 2001, he flew cross-country competitions.

He has been a member of the German national glider aerobatics team since 2005. He was the German National Glider Aerobatics Champion in 2006, 2008 and 2010. In the FAI World Championships in 2007 he won the team silver medal with Olaf Schmidt and Eugen Schaal.
In addition, Markus Feyerabend came second in the unknown sequences category in World Championships in 2007 and European Glider Aerobatic Championships 2008.
He was placed first by the Deutscher Aeroclub (DAeC) in 2008 in their ranking list of German glider pilots in the unlimited aerobatic category.

For aerobatics he usually flies a Swift S-1.

He works as a systems engineer in a telecommunication company.

Annotations: Nowadays, the Salzmann-Cup plays a similar role as state championships in Germany, which usually take place as central championships in one federal state. The translations of the names of the German federal state championships ("Landesmeisterschaften" and "Blockmeisterschaften") are not strictly literal. This table contains no rankings in double seater competitions and no rankings in individual disciplines (known, unknown, free). The definition of the advanced category may vary slightly in different glider aerobatic competitions.

References

External links
 Website of the Acro Team Weilheim-Peißenberg about Markus "Maxu" Feyerabend (in German)

Aerobatic pilots
German aviators
German glider pilots
Living people
1971 births